Jack Michael Martínez (born October 12, 1981) is a Dominican professional basketball player.

High school career
Jack Martinez attended Artesia High School in Lakewood, California, playing alongside Jason Kapono and Jón Arnór Stefánsson. It later emerged he and other foreign players on the team had been illegally recruited by coach Wayne Merino.

Professional career
Martinez's career took him to Venezuela, Puerto Rico, Italy where he was the Lega Basket Serie A top rebounder in 2006, the Dominican Republic, and Mexico.

National team career

Martínez made his debut for the Dominican Republic national basketball team in 2001. He was named MVP at the 2004 Centrobasket in Santo Domingo, Dominican Republic, where his team claimed the gold medal by defeating Puerto Rico in the final.

References

External links
 LNB Profile
 Liga BSN Profile
 Latinbasket Profile

1981 births
Living people
Basketball players at the 2003 Pan American Games
Basketball players at the 2011 Pan American Games
Caciques de Humacao players
Centers (basketball)
Central American and Caribbean Games bronze medalists for the Dominican Republic
Central American and Caribbean Games medalists in basketball
Competitors at the 2006 Central American and Caribbean Games
Club San Martín de Corrientes basketball players
Dominican Republic expatriate basketball people in Italy
Dominican Republic expatriate basketball people in Mexico
Dominican Republic expatriate basketball people in Puerto Rico
Dominican Republic expatriate basketball people in the United States
Dominican Republic expatriate basketball people in Venezuela
Dominican Republic men's basketball players
Halcones de Xalapa players
Halcones Rojos Veracruz players
Lega Basket Serie A players
Medalists at the 2003 Pan American Games
Pan American Games medalists in basketball
Pan American Games silver medalists for the Dominican Republic
People from Lakewood, California
Power forwards (basketball)
Sportspeople from Santo Domingo
Teramo Basket players
2014 FIBA Basketball World Cup players